Love in Nepal is a 2004 Indian Hindi romantic thriller film directed by Rajat Mukherjee which was released on 6 March 2004. Unlike Sonu Nigam in the male lead, who is otherwise a well known Bollywood playback singer, the film has Nepali film actress Jharana Bajracharya and Richa Ghimire from Nepal and Flora Saini in the female lead. This is Sonu Nigam's second film as the male lead.

Plot
Abby (Sonu Nigam) is creative head of a private Ad Agency in Mumbai, which is on the growth curve when the owner of the ad agency decides to sell it to an American multinational with Maxi (Flora Saini) as the new VP in charge of the merged entity. Abby and George (Rajendranath Zutshi), who is the account executive in the agency, do not want the merger as they feel they don't need another agency for their growth. When Maxi comes on board, she doesn't like Abby's lack of punctuality and now wants him to work with her as per her directives. This sets the ball rolling with multiple tiffs laced with situational comedy, between the new VP and Abby. Maxi decides to shoot a campaign for a new and important customer in Pokhara where the tiff between her and Abby continues. As they are directing the shoot standing on a dingy on a fast moving river, the dingy cuts loose and both Abby and Maxi are swept away by the strong currents and somehow manage to swim ashore together and it is here they realize that they do like each other.

An event takes place that suddenly morphs the movie from a lighthearted comedy into a thriller. One evening Tanya (Jharana Bajracharya), an attractive woman, and a native of Pokhara, who was a fellow traveler on the flight from Mumbai lands up with Abby that angers Maxi and she refuses to speak normally to Abby the next day. Abby, also a bit hurt and angry, lands up spending the night with Tanya after a drinking bout only to wake up the next day and see that she is lying murdered next to him. He runs away from the scene, quite certain that he will be blamed for killing her. He confesses the real fact to Maxi and his friend Sandy (Sweta Keswani). As the local police start to chase the leads, Abby confides in Bunty (Rajpal Yadav), the local Guide, and Maxi, and both disbelieve him.  He also starts to get calls from a stranger demanding something. With police in hot chase, it is now up to him to find out who really killed Tanya, what was the motive for her death, and who wanted him at the scene of the crime.

Cast 
 Sonu Nigam as Abhinav Sinha (Abby)
 Flora Saini as Meenaxi Malhotra (Maxi)
 Jharana Bajracharya as Tanya
 Sweta Keswani as Sandhya aka Sandy
 Vijay Raaz as Tony Chang
 Rajpal Yadav as Bunty (Guide)
 Rajendranath Zutshi as George
 Ehsan Khan as Prithvi Singh
 Asif Basra as Ram Mohan or ravan
 Ganesh Yadav as Gajji
 Richa Ghimire as Ruby
 Vishal O Sharma as Negi

Soundtracks
 Ek Anjaan Ladki Se - Sonu Nigam - Nikhil-Vinay - Sameer
 Bolo Kyaa Khayaal Hai - Sonu Nigam, Sunidhi Chauhan - Vishal–Shekhar - Sameer
 Katraa Katraa - Sunidhi Chauhan - Nikhil-Vinay - Sameer
 Love In Nepal - Sonu Nigam
 Mushkil Hai - Sonu Nigam - Anu Malik - Sameer
 Suttaa Maar Le - Sonu Nigam, Hema Sardesai - Nikhil-Vinay - Sameer

See also
Cinema of India
List of Hindi films

References

External links
 

Films scored by Anu Malik
2004 films
2000s Hindi-language films
Films scored by Vishal–Shekhar
Films set in Nepal
Films shot in Nepal
Indian romantic thriller films
Films scored by Nikhil-Vinay
2000s romantic thriller films
Films shot in Pokhara